Bashful Buccaneer is a 1925 American silent comedy film directed by Harry Joe Brown and starring Reed Howes, Dorothy Dwan and Sheldon Lewis.

Cast
 Reed Howes as Jerry Logan 
 Dorothy Dwan as Nancy Lee 
 Sheldon Lewis as First Mate 
 Bull Montana as Second Mate 
 Jimmy Aubrey as Cook 
 Sam Allen as Captain 
 George B. French as Clipper Jones
 Sailor Sharkey 
 Gunboat Smith

References

Bibliography
 Buck Rainey. Sweethearts of the sage: biographies and filmographies of 258 actresses appearing in western movies. McFarland & Company Incorporated Pub, 1992.

External links
 

1925 films
1926 comedy films
1926 films
1920s English-language films
American silent feature films
Silent American comedy films
American black-and-white films
Films directed by Harry Joe Brown
Rayart Pictures films
1925 comedy films
1920s American films